There are about 20,000 Hindus (0.35% of the population) in Norway as of 2020.
Most of these Hindus are of South Asian descent with the majority (around 75%) of those being ethnically Tamil Hindus from Sri Lanka.

History 
Hinduism was first introduced to Norway in 1914 by Swami Sri Ananda Acharya (1881-1945).

A small number of Gujarati Hindus came to Norway after the Dictator Idi Amin expelled the Indians from Uganda 1972. During the Sri Lankan Civil War of 1983, many Tamil Hindus migrated from Sri Lanka to Norway.

Demographics

Ethnic Background of Hindus in Norway

Diaspora Hindus in Norway include Tamil (Sri Lankan and Indian) families, Punjabi families, families from the Uttar Pradesh region, as well as Gujaratis and Bengalis.

Specifically among Norwegian Hindus, Sri Lankan Tamils are the dominant ethnicity constituting a large number (roughly half of the entire Hindu population or greater) of around 5000-7000 people.

Hindu Associations in Norway

There are numerous Hindu associations in Norway.
Sanatan Mandir Sabha is a Hindu religious association in eastern Norway with around 900 members. The Sanatan Mandir Sabha  SMS was registered on April 14, 1988.
Gujaratis had formed a Gujarati cultural association in the Oslo area.
Tamil Cultural center for children who were born in or who have immigrated to Norway exists in Norway. This center has the following activities: 
Teaching Tamil 
Teaching religion (Hinduism) 
Promoting drama, dance, music and sports.
Vishwa Hindu Parishad is registered in Norway.

ISKCON has a Centre in Norway
Address- Oslo, Norway, Jonsrudvej 1G, 0274, Oslode presence.

Hindu Temples in Norway

There are currently 5 Hindu Temples in Norway
Sanatan Mandir Sabha Temple is located at Slemmestad, outside of Oslo. It was the first registered Hindu religious community or temple in Norway
Hindu Sanatan Mandir Temple is located in Drammen
The Sivasubramanayar Alayam (also known as the Norwegian Hindu Centre) in Ammerud (in Oslo)
The Bergen Hindu Sabha in Danmarksplass (in Bergen) 
Sri Tiller Ganesha Temple in Trondheim

Hindu Festivals in Norway
Most major Hindu festivals such as Diwali are celebrated annually in Norway.

Hindus in Norway, mainly Tamil Hindus from Sri Lanka, celebrate the 12-day annual temple festival, the Mahotsav of which processions is the main feature.  It is the main annual ritual gathering of the Tamil Hindus in Norway.

Indian classical vocalist Sniti Mishra performed at a live concert in Oslo during the Holi festival in 2015. The festival is organized annually by the Norway branch of the Vishwa Hindu Parishad.

See also
Hinduism in Asia
Hinduism by country
Hinduism in Sweden
Hinduism in Finland
Encyclopedia of Hinduism
Hinduism in Austria

References

External links
International Religious Freedom Report 2006, Norway
Sanatan Mandir Sabha Hindu temple in Slemmestad
 A New Voice in European Hinduism. Rooting Tamil Traditions from Sri Lanka
[https://web.archive.org/web/20070929012337/http://213.207.98.217/index.php?q=node%2F33 Processions, Public Space and Sacred Space in the Sri Lankan Tamil Diaspora in Norway

Hinduism in Norway
Norway
Norway
Religion in Norway